Jussi Hautamäki (born 20 April 1979) is a Finnish former ski jumper.

Career

World Cup
Hautamäki's career began in the 1995 Alpine Skiing World Cup on 30 December 1995 in Oberstdorf, where he finished 39th. He earned his first World Cup podium place in the 2001 Alpine Skiing World Cup, after finishing third on 27 January 2001 in Sapporo.

Continental Cup
He achieved more success at Continental Cup level, managing two first-place finishes as well as four other podium finishes.

Personal life
Hautamäki is married and has four children, a daughter and three sons. He is the older brother of former ski jumper Matti Hautamäki.

References

External links

1979 births
Living people
Sportspeople from Oulu
Finnish male ski jumpers